Rising Fawn String Ensemble is a recording (Rounder Records, 1979) by musicians Norman Blake (guitar), his wife Nancy Blake (cello), and James Bryan (fiddle).

Track listing
 "Devil Chased Me Around the Stump"
 "Charlie Gaiter"
 "Over the Waterfall"
 "Opera Reel"
 "Cherokee Shuffle"
 "The Promise"
 "Tin Foil and Stone"
 "Three Ravens"
 "Handsome Molly"
 "Jeff Davis"
 "Da Slockit Light"
 "Briarpicker"
 "Stony Fork	"
 "Old Ties"
 "Coming Down from Rising Fawn No. 2"

References

1979 albums
Norman Blake (American musician) albums